Dominik Fitz (born 16 June 1999) is an Austrian professional footballer who plays as midfielder for Austrian Bundesliga club Austria Wien.

References 

Living people
1999 births
Association football midfielders
Austrian footballers
Austria youth international footballers
Austrian Football Bundesliga players
FK Austria Wien players